The State University of New York Student Assembly (SUNYSA) is the university-wide student government for the 64 institutions of the State University of New York (SUNY). It is empowered by Article XVII of the policies of the SUNY Board of Trustees to represent student concerns, elect the student member of the Board, and to act as a communications network between campus student leaders.

Organization
SUNY Student Assembly consists of the assembly, the Executive Board, and the Executive Committee. The assembly consists of representatives from each campus, the President as Chair and standing committee delegates. The Executive Board consists of the elected officers. Lastly, the Executive Committee consists of the officers, elected representatives, and standing committee delegates.

Executive Board
The Executive Board  consists of the President, Vice President, Treasurer, and Secretary. The duties of each are prescribed by Article XVII and the organization's bylaws

The executive board for the 2022 - 2023 academic year consists of Alexandria Chun as President, Michael Casey as Vice President, Jacob Longuil as Treasurer and Tasnia Zzoha as Secretary, and Chance Fiorisi as Parliamentarian.

Executive committee
The Executive Committee is made up of three divisions, that come together to act on behalf of the assembly. These divisions consist of the Executive Board, the elected representatives from the student body at large and nonvoting representatives from standing committees.

Elected Representatives
The Student Assembly is composed of student Representatives from across the University who are elected by their peers from the 64 campuses of SUNY. They divided into sectors, based on the type of institution with in the SUNY system. The Representatives for the 2022-2023 academic year are as follows:

Voting rights on the Board of Trustees
In the 1970s, students pressed for voting representation on the governing board of SUNY colleges. In 1971, the State Legislature added five student voting members to Cornell's Board of Trustees. However, at that time, all members of a board must be over the age of 21 for a corporation to hold a liquor license, so to allow Cornell to retain its license, the legislature had to go back to amend NYS Alcoholic Beverage Control Law § 126(4) to require that half the board must be 21. In 1975, the legislature added a non-voting student seat to the boards of all SUNY units. Two Attorney General of the State of New York opinion letters[42] reduced the parliamentary rights of the student members to participate at meetings and indicated that they were not in fact Public Officers, and arguably subject to personal liability from lawsuits. In 1977, another statutory amendment made student members of SUNY councils and boards subject to the NYS Public Officers Law or NYS General Municipal Law and granted student representatives parliamentary powers of moving or seconding motions and of placing items on the agendas of the bodies. Finally, the legislature gave full voting rights to the student members in 1979, resulting in the students of all SUNY units having voting representatives, except for the NYS College of Environmental Science and Forestry. Finally, in 1986, the legislature gave the student representative of that college voting rights as well.

References

External links
 Official Website

State University of New York
Student governments in New York (state)
Student governments of the State University of New York
SUNY shared governance organizations